Thomas MacDonald (born September 21, 1988) is a Canadian rapper, songwriter, and former professional wrestler. MacDonald first rose to prominence with the release of his song "Dear Rappers". His songs "Fake Woke", "Snowflakes", and "Brainwashed" all appeared on the Billboard Hot 100 in 2021.

Life and career
MacDonald lived in British Columbia and Alberta. He later worked as a professional wrestler under the ring name Allstar. MacDonald struggled with alcoholism throughout much of his life, and in 2017, had a "bad breakdown" that prompted him to begin rehabilitation.

MacDonald started rapping at age 18, and first rose to fame after releasing the single "Dear Rappers" in February 2018. His song "Straight White Male", which was written about MacDonald's belief that straight white men are being demonized, was criticized on social media for its subject matter. In September 2019, MacDonald released the single "Cloned Rappers", on which he rapped that the Illuminati are cloning rappers and disposing of the originals. In late 2019, MacDonald was scheduled to be a supporting act for Falling in Reverse's Episode IV Tour before it was canceled. In 2020, he released 20 singles, including "White Trash", "Sellout", "Best Rapper Ever", "Cancer", and "Angels". In March 2020, MacDonald released the single "Coronavirus", which was written about the COVID-19 pandemic.

In January 2021, MacDonald released the single "Fake Woke", which debuted at number 96 on the Billboard Hot 100. After Eminem released a series of NFTs as part of his "Shady Con" event with Nifty Gateway, MacDonald purchased one—an Eminem-produced instrumental called "Stan's Revenge"—for $100,000. MacDonald used the instrumental to create his song "Dear Slim", released in May 2021. The song's accompanying music video paid homage to the music video for Eminem's 2000 song "Stan". In June 2021, he released "Snowflakes", which debuted on the Billboard Hot 100 at number 71. The music video featured  political commentator Blaire White as a background dancer. His single "Brainwashed", released in August 2021, peaked at number 89 on the Billboard Hot 100.

Influences
MacDonald has cited the Beatles, Pink Floyd, Led Zeppelin, Black Sabbath, Joe Cocker, Janis Joplin, Marilyn Manson, Tupac, Eminem, Aerosmith, GG Allin, Kanye West, and The Offspring as musical influences. His music often discusses controversial social and political topics in the United States.

Public image
Writing for Vice, Drew Millard described MacDonald as "turgid", and wrote that he rose to fame by "taking the undercooked platitudes of the Intellectual Dark Web and filtering them into songs", adding that he "can feel like an unstoppable force of reactionary dumbness". Ariana Thompson of Inked described MacDonald as "one of the most divisive personas hip hop has ever seen" and wrote that his right-wing fanbase "cling[s] onto every word he utter[s]".

Discography

Studio albums

Mixtapes

EPs

Compilations

Singles

As lead artist

As a featured artist

Notes

References

External links 

Official YouTube channel

1988 births
Living people
Canadian male rappers
Canadian YouTubers
Musicians from British Columbia
YouTube channels launched in 2014
21st-century Canadian rappers
21st-century Canadian male musicians
Canadian male songwriters
Conservative media in Canada